Gillian Mears (21 July 1964 – 16 May 2016) was an Australian short story writer and novelist.
Her books Ride a Cock Horse and The Grass Sister won a Commonwealth Writers' Prize, shortlist, in 1989 and 1996, respectively. The Mint Lawn won The Australian/Vogel Award.  
In 2003, A Map of the Gardens won the Steele Rudd Award.

Life
Mears was born at Lismore Base Hospital, and raised in Grafton, New South Wales where she was school dux of Grafton High School.

She moved to Sydney to study at university, beginning a degree in archaeology at the University of Sydney having been inspired to pursue a career in archaeology after reading Gods, Graves and Scholars by C. W. Ceram. At the age of 18, she withdrew from the course, and instead completed a degree in communications at University of Technology, Sydney.

She lived near Grafton, New South Wales. She died in May 2016 after living with multiple sclerosis for seventeen years.

Bernadette Brennan has written a biography of Gillian Mears.

Awards and honours
 1989 Commonwealth Writers' Prize, shortlist, Ride a Cock Horse
 1990 The Australian/Vogel Literary Award, winner, The Mint Lawn 
 1996 Commonwealth Writers' Prize, shortlist, The Grass Sister
 2003 Steele Rudd Award, winner, A Map of the Gardens
 2011 Colin Roderick Award, winner, Foal's Bread
 2012 Barbara Jefferis Award, shortlist, Foal's Bread 2012 Miles Franklin Award, shortlist, Foal's Bread 2012 Australian Literature Society, Gold Medal, Foal's Bread 2012 Prime Minister's Literary Awards, Fiction Award, Foal's BreadWorks

NovelsThe Mint Lawn, Allen & Unwin, 1991,  The Grass Sister, Alfred A. Knopf, 1995,  Foal's Bread, Allen & Unwin, 2011, 

Short storiesRide a Cock Horse Pascoe Publishing, 1988,  Collected stories, University of Queensland Press, 1997,  A map of the gardens: stories, Pan Macmillan Australia, 2002, 

Non-fictionParadise is a place, Photographer Sandy Edwards, Random House Australia, 1997, 

EssaysAlive in Ant and Bee Fairy Death Children's bookThe Cat with the Coloured Tail'', Walker Books, 2015,  (illustrated by Dinale Dabarera)

References

Further reading

External links

1964 births
2016 deaths
Australian women short story writers
Writers from New South Wales
University of Sydney alumni
University of Technology Sydney alumni
Australian women novelists
20th-century Australian novelists
21st-century Australian novelists
20th-century Australian women writers
21st-century Australian women writers
ALS Gold Medal winners
People from Grafton, New South Wales
Deaths from multiple sclerosis
20th-century Australian short story writers
21st-century Australian short story writers